McCulloch's hardyhead (Atherion maccullochi) is a species of silverside from the family Atherionidae. This species occurs off the coasts of Australia. It was described by David Starr Jordan and Carl Leavitt Hubbs in 1919 from a type locality of Lord Howe Island and the specific name honours the Australian ichthyologist Allan Riverstone McCulloch (1885-1925), who was Curator of Fishes at the Australian Museum and who provided Jordan and Hubbs with the type.

References

Atherion
Taxa named by David Starr Jordan
Taxa named by Carl Leavitt Hubbs
Fish described in 1919